The Harvest, Pontoise is a late 19th-century painting by Dano-French artist Camille Pissarro. Done in oil on canvas, the work depicts a group of French farmers gathering potatoes; such subject material was a common theme used by Pissarro. The painting is in the collection of the Metropolitan Museum of Art.

See also
List of paintings by Camille Pissarro

References

External links

1881 paintings
Paintings by Camille Pissarro
Paintings in the collection of the Metropolitan Museum of Art
Farming in art

Oil paintings